Tuskaroria ultraabyssalis is a species of sea snail, a marine gastropod mollusk in the family Raphitomidae.

Description

Distribution
This deep-sea species was found off the Kurile-Kamchatka Trench, Northern Pacific.

References

 Sysoev, A. V. "Ultra-abyssal findings of mollusks of the family Turridae (Gastropoda, Toxoglossa) in the Pacific Ocean." Zoologichesky Zhurnal 67.7 (1988): 965-973.

External links
 

ultraabyssalis
Gastropods described in 1988